The 1988–89 NHL season was the 72nd season of the National Hockey League. The Calgary Flames won an all-Canadian Stanley Cup final against the Montreal Canadiens four games to two. This remains the last time two Canadian teams faced each other for the Stanley Cup.

Regular season
This year saw the start of Wayne Gretzky's tenure with the Los Angeles Kings, having been traded in the off-season after leading the Edmonton Oilers to the 1988 Stanley Cup. Coinciding with Gretzky's acquisition, the team also changed its uniforms and colours for 1988–89, scrapping the purple and gold associated with its co-tenant at the Great Western Forum, the NBA's Los Angeles Lakers, in favour of black and silver. Gretzky's presence signaled a dramatic on-ice turnaround for the Kings. Prior to his arrival via trade with the Edmonton Oilers on August 9, 1988, Los Angeles had the fourth-worst record in the NHL at 30 wins, 42 losses, and 8 ties. After Gretzky's first season with the Kings, however, they moved all the way up to fourth-best in the NHL, with a record of 42 wins, 31 losses, and 7 ties for 91 points. They also managed to defeat Gretzky's former team, the Oilers, in seven games in the Smythe Division Semifinal before falling victim to a four-game sweep at the hands of the eventual Cup champion Flames in the Division Final.

Four years after Andy Van Hellemond became the first on-ice official to wear a helmet, the NHL also made helmets mandatory for its officials like it did with its players in 1979; like the ruling for players, any official that was not wearing a helmet before the ruling could also go helmetless if they so desired.

Mario Lemieux of the Pittsburgh Penguins won the Art Ross Trophy for the second consecutive season, leading the league with 199 points and recording all three of his eight point games in his career, with one of them happening during the playoffs. Lemieux remains the only player other than Gretzky to approach the 200 point plateau (Gretzky surpassed the 200 point mark four times in five years during the 1980s). This was the only season that there were four players that scored 150 or more points; Gretzky tallied 168, while Steve Yzerman and Bernie Nicholls totalled 155 and 150 points, respectively. This was also the only time that two teammates, Gretzky and Nicholls of the Los Angeles Kings, had hit the 150 point mark. Narrowly edging out Lemieux, Gretzky won his ninth Hart Memorial Trophy as the league's MVP, while Yzerman finished third in the balloting. Yzerman was voted by his fellow players as the NHLPA MVP, taking the Lester B. Pearson Award.

New York Rangers rookie Brian Leetch broke the record for goals by a rookie defenceman with 23. He finished that season with 71 points and easily captured the Calder Memorial Trophy.

On March 22, an incident took place in Buffalo during a game between the Buffalo Sabres and the St. Louis Blues. During a goalmouth collision between the Blues' Steve Tuttle and the Sabres' Uwe Krupp, Tuttle's skate blade slashed the throat of Buffalo goaltender Clint Malarchuk, severing the latter's jugular vein. Thanks to some timely action by Sabres trainer and former US Army Vietnam War veteran Jim Pizzutelli, Malarchuk quickly received treatment and was released from the hospital the next day. He returned to action 10 days later.

This was the first season that every NHL arena had full rink board advertisements.

Final standings
Note: W = Wins, L = Losses, T = Ties, GF= Goals For, GA = Goals Against, Pts = Points

Prince of Wales Conference

Clarence Campbell Conference

Playoffs

The 1989 Stanley Cup Final featured two Canadian hockey teams, the Montreal Canadiens and the Calgary Flames. Montreal finished the regular season with 115 points, only two behind the league leader Calgary. They had last faced each other only three years earlier, with Montreal winning a five-game series in 1986.  Calgary was only the second opposing team in NHL history to win a Stanley Cup at the Montreal Forum (the New York Rangers defeated the Montreal Maroons in 1928) and the first to do so against the Canadiens, marking the first time since  that the Stanley Cup wasn't awarded in the province of Alberta.

Playoff bracket

Stanley Cup Finals

The Stanley Cup Finals was decided between the top two teams during the 1988–89 NHL regular season. Co-captain Lanny McDonald scored the second Flames goal in Game 6. This turned out to be the last goal in his Hockey Hall of Fame career as he retired during the following off-season. Doug Gilmour scored two goals in the third period, including the eventual game and Cup winner to cement the victory for the Flames.

Awards

All-Star teams

Player statistics

Scoring leaders

Note: GP = Games played; G = Goals; A = Assists; Pts = Points, PIM = Penalties in minutes, PPG = Powerplay Goals, SHG = Shorthanded Goals, GWG = Game Winning Goals

Source: NHL.

Leading goaltenders

GP = Games played; Min = Minutes played; W = Wins; L = Losses; T = Ties; SO = Shutouts; GAA = Goals against average; Sv% = Save percentage

Source: Quanthockey.com.

Coaches

Patrick Division
New Jersey Devils: Jim Schoenfeld
New York Islanders: Al Arbour
New York Rangers: Michel Bergeron and Phil Esposito
Philadelphia Flyers: Paul Holmgren
Pittsburgh Penguins: Gene Ubriaco
Washington Capitals: Bryan Murray

Adams Division
Boston Bruins: Terry O'Reilly
Buffalo Sabres: Ted Sator
Hartford Whalers: Larry Pleau
Montreal Canadiens: Pat Burns
Quebec Nordiques: Ron Lapointe and Jean Perron

Norris Division
Chicago Blackhawks: Mike Keenan
Detroit Red Wings: Jacques Demers
Minnesota North Stars: Pierre Page
St. Louis Blues: Brian Sutter
Toronto Maple Leafs: John Brophy and George Armstrong

Smythe Division
Calgary Flames: Terry Crisp
Edmonton Oilers: Glen Sather
Los Angeles Kings: Robbie Ftorek
Vancouver Canucks: Bob McCammon
Winnipeg Jets: Dan Maloney

Milestones

Debuts
The following is a list of players of note who played their first NHL game in 1988–89 (listed with their first team, asterisk(*) marks debut in playoffs):
Don Sweeney, Boston Bruins
Stephane Quintal, Boston Bruins
Sergei Pryakhin, Calgary Flames
Paul Ranheim, Calgary Flames
Theoren Fleury, Calgary Flames
Ed Belfour, Chicago Blackhawks
Jeremy Roenick, Chicago Blackhawks
Randy McKay, Detroit Red Wings
Tim Cheveldae, Detroit Red Wings
Martin Gelinas, Edmonton Oilers
Mike Modano*, Minnesota North Stars
Eric Desjardins, Montreal Canadiens
Jyrki Lumme, Montreal Canadiens
Mike Keane, Montreal Canadiens
Eric Weinrich, New Jersey Devils
Paul Ysebaert, New Jersey Devils
Tom Fitzgerald, New York Islanders
Tony Granato, New York Rangers
Mike Richter*, New York Rangers
John Cullen, Pittsburgh Penguins
Mark Recchi, Pittsburgh Penguins
Curtis Leschyshyn, Quebec Nordiques
Joe Sakic, Quebec Nordiques
Rod Brind'Amour*, St. Louis Blues
Trevor Linden, Vancouver Canucks
Bob Essensa, Winnipeg Jets

Last games
The following is a list of players of note that played their last game in the NHL in 1988–89 (listed with their last team):
Mark Napier, Buffalo Sabres
Hakan Loob, Calgary Flames
Lanny McDonald, Calgary Flames
Doug Halward, Edmonton Oilers
Tomas Jonsson, Edmonton Oilers
John Anderson, Hartford Whalers
Ron Duguay, Los Angeles Kings
Craig Hartsburg, Minnesota North Stars
Dennis Maruk, Minnesota North Stars (The last active player to have been a member of the California Golden Seals/Cleveland Barons franchise.)
Bob Gainey, Montreal Canadiens
Billy Smith, New York Islanders
Marcel Dionne, New York Rangers
Anton Stastny, Quebec Nordiques
Mel Bridgman, Vancouver Canucks
Bengt Gustafsson, Washington Capitals

Firsts
Ron Hextall, Philadelphia Flyers, First goaltender to score a goal in post-season.

Trading deadline
 Trading deadline: March 7, 1989.
February 27, 1989: Peter Deboer traded from Toronto to Vancouver for Paul Lawless.
March 4, 1989: Perry Berezan and Shane Churla traded from Calgary to Minnesota for Brian MacLellan and Minnesota's fourth round choice in 1989 Entry Draft.
March 6, 1989: Ken Wregget traded from Toronto to Philadelphia for future considerations.
March 7, 1989: Clint Malarchuk, Grant Ledyard and Washington's sixth round pick in 1991 Entry Draft traded from Washington to Buffalo for Calle Johansson and Buffalo's second round pick in 1989 Entry Draft.
March 7, 1989: Jim Pavese traded from Detroit to Hartford for Torrie Robertson.
March 7, 1989: Lindy Ruff traded from Buffalo to NY Rangers for NY Rangers' fifth round pick in 1990 Entry Draft.
March 7, 1989: Reed Larson traded from NY Islanders to Minnesota for future considerations.
March 7, 1989: Claude Vilgrain traded from Vancouver to New Jersey for Tim Lenardon.
March 7, 1989: Brian Wilk and John English traded from Los Angeles to Edmonton for Jim Wiemer and Alan May.
March 7, 1989: Greg Gilbert traded from NY Islanders to Chicago for Chicago's fifth round pick in 1989 Entry Draft.
March 7, 1989: Washington Capitals obtain Dino Ciccarelli and Bob Rouse from the Minnesota North Stars for Mike Gartner and Larry Murphy.
 March 7, 1989: Jean Leblanc and Vancouver's fifth round pick in 1989 Entry Draft traded from Vancouver to Edmonton for Doug Smith and Greg C. Adams.

See also
List of Stanley Cup champions
1988 NHL Entry Draft
1988 NHL Supplemental Draft
40th National Hockey League All-Star Game
National Hockey League All-Star Game
NHL All-Rookie Team
1988 in sports
1989 in sports

References
 
 
 
 
Notes

External links
Hockey Database
NHL.com

 
1988–89 in Canadian ice hockey by league
1988–89 in American ice hockey by league